Surapurata Kanyaviyak is a 2002 Sri Lankan Sinhala comedy film directed by Mario Jayatunga and produced by Suren Yasin for Yasin Films. It stars Dilhani Ekanayake and Srinath Maddumage in lead roles along with Veena Jayakody and Srinath Maddumage. Music is composed by Sarath Wickrama. It is the 994th Sri Lankan film in the Sinhala cinema.

Plot

Cast
 Dilhani Ekanayake
 Veena Jayakody
 Srinath Maddumage
 G.R Perera
 Sureni Senarath
 Thalatha Gunasekara
 Priyantha Wijekoon
 Ravindra Yasas
 Suresh Gamage
 Manel Wanaguru
 Manike Attanayake
 Nanda Wickramage
 Sarath Dikkumbura
 Gayana Sudarshani

References

2002 films
2000s Sinhala-language films
2002 comedy films
Sri Lankan comedy films